Yuliya Anatolyevna Gerasymova (born September 15, 1989) is a Ukrainian volleyball player. She has participated in three European Championships.

Biography

Early life 
She was born on September 15, 1989, in Odessa. She was a student at Odessa Children's and Youth Sports School No. 8, with Irina Ishchuk as her first coach.

Sports career 
Throughout her sports career, she played for the teams Khimik, Orbita-ZTMK-ZNU, TED, Karayollari, Prometheus.

As part of the Ukrainian national team, she became the winner of the Euroleague 2017. Participant of three European Championships (2017, 2019, 2021).

Master of Sports of Ukraine 
As a member of the Southern Chemist, she won five national championships and played in the semifinals of the Continental CEV Challenge Cup in the 2014/15 season. After a season in the "Orbit" of Zaporozhye, she played for five years in Turkish clubs. In late 2021 she signed a contract with SC Prometey in the Dnipropetrovsk region with whom she made her debut on December 17 in the Ukrainian championship against Alnanta Dnipro.

On January 18, 2022, SC Prometey played the fourth round of the Champions League against Polish club DevelopRes Rzeszów. During one of the technical breaks, from the bench, she tried to cheer on her partners and her dance became popular on TikTok, receiving more than 90 million views on February 11, 2022.

As a member of the national team, she won the Euroleague 2017. Participating in three European Volleyball Championships.

Clubs 

  VK Khimik (2004-2015) 
  Orbita-ZTMK-ZNU (2015-2016)
  TED Ankara Kolejliler (2016-2018)
  Karayolları Spor Kulübü (2018-2021)
  SC Prometey (2021-2022)
  Roleski Grupa Azoty ANS Tarnów (2022-2023)

Awards

With the national team 

 2017 Women's European Volleyball League

With clubs 

 Five-time Ukrainian Women's Volleyball Super League (2011, 2012, 2013, 2014, 2015)
 Silver medalist of the championship of Ukraine (2016)
 Two-time winner of the Cup of Ukraine (2014, 2015)
 Two-time silver medalist of the Cup of Ukraine (2011, 2012)

References

External links 

 
 
 

1989 births
Living people
Ukrainian women's volleyball players
Ukrainian expatriate sportspeople in Turkey
Expatriate volleyball players in Turkey